Marvel Studios: Legends is an American television docuseries created for the streaming service Disney+, based on the Marvel Comics characters and objects that appear in the Marvel Cinematic Universe (MCU). Produced by Marvel Studios, each episode showcases an individual character or object with footage from past MCU films and Disney+ series, highlighting their prominent moments from the MCU.

The series was first announced in December 2020. Marvel Studios: Legends premiered on January 8, 2021, with subsequent episodes releasing shortly before a Disney+ series or special's premiere or a film's initial release. It received positive responses for being helpful to casual viewers of the franchise, but criticism for being a clip show with no new footage or documentary elements. The first season covers projects in Phase Four, while a second is intended to cover projects in Phase Five.

Premise 
The series examines individual heroes, villains, moments, and objects from the Marvel Cinematic Universe (MCU) and how they connect, in anticipation of the upcoming stories that will feature them in the Disney+ series, films, and Special Presentations in Phase Four and Phase Five.

Background 
Marvel Studios: Legends was announced in December 2020 as a new series that would revisit characters from the Marvel Cinematic Universe (MCU) ahead of their appearances in new feature films and Disney+ series as part of Phase Four of the MCU. The series features short episodes made up of footage from past MCU films that featured the highlighted character, moment, or object. Two episodes were initially announced, with one for Wanda Maximoff and one for Vision ahead of their roles in WandaVision. Upon its announcement, many commentators believed the series would be a clip show and a good way to remind viewers of a character's history and allow casual viewers a quick way to catch-up without watching hours of past MCU content. Chaim Gartenberg at The Verge also likened the series to the one-page recaps Marvel Comics uses to similarly catch readers up for ongoing stories. Collider Matt Goldberg felt Marvel Studios: Legends did not cost Disney or Marvel Studios "anything more than some editor's work and a bit of music" to produce given each episode's length and content.

In February 2021, Legends episodes for Falcon, Winter Soldier, Zemo, and Sharon Carter were announced ahead of The Falcon and the Winter Soldier. In May 2021, before the release of the first season of Loki, episodes for Loki and the Tesseract were announced. The following month, an episode for Natasha Romanoff / Black Widow was announced ahead of the character's appearance in the Phase Four film Black Widow (2021), which was set to be made available on Disney+ with Premier Access. In July, episodes for Peggy Carter, the Avengers Initiative, and the Ravagers were announced, ahead of their appearances in the first season of the animated series What If...?. In August, before the release of Shang-Chi and the Legend of the Ten Rings, an episode for the Ten Rings organization was announced. In October, an episode for Clint Barton / Hawkeye was announced to debut for Disney+'s "Disney+ Day" event, ahead of the character's appearance in Hawkeye.

In April 2022, episodes for Dr. Stephen Strange, Wong, and Wanda Maximoff / Scarlet Witch were announced, ahead of the characters' appearances in Doctor Strange in the Multiverse of Madness (2022). At the end of June, three episodes for Thor, Jane Foster, and Valkyrie were revealed, ahead of their appearances in Thor: Love and Thunder (2022). A Legends episode for Bruce Banner was revealed in August 2022, ahead of his appearance in She-Hulk: Attorney at Law (2022). In October, episodes for T'Challa, Shuri, and the Dora Milaje were revealed, ahead of their appearances in Black Panther: Wakanda Forever (2022), and the following month, episodes for Mantis and Drax were revealed, ahead of their appearances in The Guardians of the Galaxy Holiday Special (2022).

In January 2023, episodes for Scott Lang / Ant-Man, Hank Pym and Janet van Dyne, and Hope van Dyne / Wasp were revealed, ahead of their appearances in the Phase Five film Ant-Man and the Wasp: Quantumania (2023), which began the second season of Legends.

Episodes 
Each episode consists entirely of archival footage from previous MCU films and television series.

Season 1 (2021–22)

Season 2 (2023)

Release 
Marvel Studios: Legends released its first two episodes on January 8, 2021, on Disney+. Additional episodes were released before a character's appearance in a Disney+ series, special, or film. The "Mantis" and "Drax" episodes were removed from Disney+ shortly after their release on November 23, 2022. It is believed the removal was because of the inclusion of a Guardians of the Galaxy Vol. 2 deleted scene in the "Mantis" episode, where the character was revealed as Peter Quill's sister; this was assumed to be a plot point that would be featured in The Guardians of the Galaxy Holiday Special. Both episodes were later restored.

Episodes for Ant-Man and the Wasp: Quantumania were released on February 10, 2023, on Disney+, beginning the second season of Legends. Those episodes were eventually made available for free on Marvel Entertainment's YouTube channel on February 16.

Reception 
Matt Goldberg at Collider described Legends as "elaborate fan videos that offer cross-promotion" for Marvel, which he did not think was bad but he did wish that the series "offered up something new", such as actors "talking about their characters or offering a fresh teaser for" what was being promoted. He concluded that Legends was "content to be a highly produced recap video". Charlie Ridgely, writing for ComicBook.com, called Legends "incredibly handy" given there had not been any new MCU content in 2020. While conceding viewers already familiar with the highlighted character's stories might not see the need for the episodes since they were "quite literally just a recap of what happened in the movies", he felt it was still "a great refresher" for viewers interested in the new Marvel Disney+ content who "maybe aren't as into the greater MCU... allow[ing] everyone to be on a similar page". Variety Caroline Framke felt Marvel was anticipating confusion from casual MCU viewers during their new Disney+ series, and called Legends "pretty helpful" heading into WandaVision. Some viewers were disappointed in the series, expecting a more in-depth documentary with creatives providing interviews rather than a clip show.

Related documentaries 
In February 2021, fellow Marvel Studios docuseries Marvel Studios: Assembled was announced. Some commentators called Assembled a companion series to Legends since Assembled presents behind-the-scenes material after an MCU film or series. In June 2022, the documentary short A Fan's Guide to Ms. Marvel was released on Disney+ in preparation for the character's debut in the series Ms. Marvel. It featured an exclusive look at the production of the series and interviews from the filmmaking team and star Iman Vellani.

Notes

References

External links 
  at Marvel.com
 
 
 

2020s American documentary television series
2020s American television miniseries
2021 American television series debuts
American documentary television series
Clip shows
Disney+ original programming
English-language television shows
Marvel Cinematic Universe television series
Television series by Marvel Studios